HM Prison Kennet was a Category C men's prison, located in Parkbourn, Maghull, in the Metropolitan Borough of Sefton in Merseyside, England. The prison was operated by Her Majesty's Prison Service. The prison closed on 23 December 2016

History
Faced with overcrowding in regional prisons, the National Offender Management Service in December 2006 planned a new facility on the East Site of Ashworth Hospital, which it leases from Mersey Care NHS Foundation Trust. The site of the new prison and surrounding area were known locally as Kennet Heath, so the name Kennet was adopted for the prison.

The prison was converted from the existing medical buildings at a cost of £19 million. It began accepting inmates in September 2007, but was officially opened in February 2008.

In April 2010, The Howard League for Penal Reform rated Kennet as the most overcrowded prison in England and Wales. The prison was found to be running at 193% capacity.

In May 2016 it was announced that the National Offender Management Service will close Kennet Prison by July 2017, less than 10 years after it opened. Reasons for closure include high operation costs and difficulties with the design and operation of the prison. After closure the site will be returned to Mersey Care NHS Foundation Trust.

The prison before closure
Kennet Prison held Category C adult males from the surrounding area. Accommodation at the prison was divided between seven units, predominantly containing double occupancy cells with integral sanitation, showers on all landings, purpose built serveries, and association facilities. There was also an additional segregation unit.

The prison offered workshops, training and education to all prisoners. Workshops includedBricklaying, Plastering, Construction and Joinery, as well as Painting and Decorating. Education courses included Information Technology, Business Studies, Art and Design, Catering and Media Studies.

There was a visitors centre at Kennet Prison, with facilities including a children's play area and refreshments. There was access for disabled visitors throughout the visitors area.

References

External links
 Ministry of Justice pages on Kennet

Kennet
Kennett
2007 establishments in England
Kennet